Javad Fakoori (3 January 1936 – 29 September 1981) was a prominent military figure who served as the 4th defence minister of Iran in September 1980 to August 1981.

Career
Fakoori was a commander of the Islamic Republic of Iran Air Force at the rank of colonel. He entered the Iranian Air Force in 1958 as a fighter pilot of the F-100. He later qualified on the F-4 fighter-bomber in 1967. He commanded a flight, squadron, wing and group of F-4 aircraft during the Pahlavi regime. In 1978, he was promoted to colonel and stationed in Tehran as a staff officer. Despite the fact that one of his cousins was a leading member of the MEK and had sought asylum in Sweden in 1980, he had the confidence of Khomeini and Rafsanjani. With the consent of Khomeini, then-president Abolhassan Banisadr appointed him to this post in June 1980.

Fakoori was the commander of the Iranian Air Force during the Iran–Iraq War. He also served as the Iranian defence minister from spring 1981 to September 1981. Fakoori replaced Mostafa Chamran as defence minister when the latter died in a plane crash accident during the Iran–Iraq war. Mohammad Salimi replaced Fakoori as defence minister in 1981.

Death

Fakoori and other senior military officials, including Valiollah Fallahi and Mousa Namjoo, were killed in a crash near Tehran on 29 September 1981. Ayatollah Ruhollah Khomeini made a speech following the incident in which he implied the Mujahedeen Khalq as the perpetrator without clearly condemning the leftist group.

Fakoori was posthumously promoted to the rank of major general.

References

20th-century Iranian politicians
1936 births
1981 deaths
Burials at Behesht-e Zahra
Iranian aviators
Islamic Republic of Iran Army colonels
Islamic Republic of Iran Army personnel of the Iran–Iraq War
Commanders of Islamic Republic of Iran Air Force
People from Tabriz
Victims of aviation accidents or incidents in Iran